Dru (Andrew Grange) is a Canadian singer and songwriter. He is an R&B/Soul Juno Award and MuchMusic Video Award (MMVA) winner.

Musical career

Beginning in 1993, Dru was the front man for the R&B group In Essence. The group released the album The Master Plan with songs such as "You'll Never Find," which was also featured on Funkmaster Flex's gold release 60 Minutes of Funk Vol. 4. Dru's single "Gettin It In," from his album On The Brink, went to radio in August 2011, followed by the album On the Brink. The band won a Juno Award in 2004.

Dru released his solo, debut album The One in 2008, and the album was rated 3.5 out of 4 stars by the Toronto Star. He was also named emerging artist of the Month" by Canada's No. 1 CHR/Top 40 station, CHUM FM.

Dru's first three singles "The One", "Stay with Me (Always)" and "Seasons" received national radio rotation. In 2009, Dru topped the radio and video charts in both Canada and the UK as the featured artist on the hit single "Runnin" by DJs Doman & Gooding. The single earned Dru another Juno Award nomination in 2010 for "Dance Recording of The Year." Dru has been identified by Billboard Magazine as "one of the most important emerging Canadian artists".

Discography

Studio albums

Singles

MC: Gold

As a featured artist

References

External links
 http://www.druofficial.com
 

Living people
21st-century Black Canadian male singers
Canadian contemporary R&B singers
Canadian hip hop singers
Canadian male singer-songwriters
Canadian pop singers
Canadian record producers
Juno Award for Dance Recording of the Year winners
Juno Award for R&B/Soul Recording of the Year winners
Musicians from Toronto
Year of birth missing (living people)